The Rock River Times is an independently owned alternative newspaper based in Rockford, Illinois having a circulation of around 17,000 free newspapers.

The weekly newspaper, distributed every Wednesday, has been in publication since 1987. Daily headlines are offered on the paper's website.

History

The Rock River Times began as the monthly The North End Times in 1987. The paper was acquired by Frank Schier in 1992 and rebranded with its current name in 1993. Weekly publication began in December 1993.

Schier, who served as editor and publisher of the newspaper for more than 24 years, died in January 2017. The paper continued under publisher Josh Johnson, a former legals editor under Schier, who purchased the publication from his estate.

Format
The Rock River Times weekly edition comes in a tabloid format typically of 32-56 pages. Topics include local, state and national news and commentary, sports news, business news, and arts and entertainment news.

External links
Rock River Times website
Archived print issues at issuu.com

Newspapers published in Illinois
Rockford, Illinois
Companies based in Winnebago County, Illinois
Newspapers established in 1987